Volcano was a supergroup band, formed by Meat Puppets frontman Curt Kirkwood, Sublime drummer Bud Gaugh, Sublime soundman Michael 'Miguel' Happoldt, and bass player of The Ziggens Jon Poutney after the breakup of Eyes Adrift.  They released one self-titled studio album in 2004.

In an interview with Rolling Stone, Kirkwood said: "The producer says it sounds a lot like Eighties, SST-era, Up On the Sun Meat Puppets. But there's more bouncy rhythms -- we do a lot more stuff that was inspired by The Selecter, The Specials, and Bob Marley."

Kirkwood wanted to name the band "Pine Cone", but was outvoted by other group members.

The album was released as a limited edition on Skunk Records and to date (2018) has not been reprinted.

Volcano was released in 2004.

Reception
Trouser Press, which gave the eponymous album by Eyes Adrift a favorable review, said that Volcano was even better.  They noted the "simple rough-in-the-studio mix", the reggae feel of Poutney's basslines, and the "high lonesome" feeling conjured by Kirkwood's "unfettered vocals".  They wrote:

Punknews.org said that the reggae- and country-influenced songs were some of the best, and called the album "one of the best of the post-Sublime era" and a "truly unique collaboration and a solid collection of songs".

Track listing
All songs by Curt Kirkwood.
 "Pine Cone" - 3:38
 "Twisted Seeds" - 3:25
 "Love Mine" - 3:35
 "It Don't Matter" - 2:23
 "Run Aground" - 3:10
 "Blown Away" - 2:12
 "Rave Only" - 3:58
 "Some Kind of Light" - 3:46
 "Arrow" - 2:50
 "Million" - 4:00
 "Volcano" - 3:48
 "Greenery" - 4:46
 "Lonesome Ghost" - 3:00

Personnel
Guitar, vocals - Curt Kirkwood
Guitar, backup vocals, production - "Mike Stand" a.k.a. Michael 'Miguel' Happoldt
Bass - Jon Poutney
Drums - Bud Gaugh

References

External links
Official Site
Meat Puppets collection at the Internet Archive's live music archive
Meat Puppets Live Repository

Rock music groups from California
Culture of Long Beach, California
Supergroups (music)
Musical groups established in 2003